Acapulco de Juárez is one of the 81 municipalities of Guerrero, in southwestern Mexico, along Acapulco Bay on the Pacific coast. The municipal seat lies at Acapulco. 

Forty percent of the municipality is mountainous terrain; another forty percent is semi-flat; and the other twenty percent is flat. The highest peaks are Potrero, San Nicolas, and Alto Camarón.

One major river runs through the municipality, the Papagayo, along with a number of arroyos (streams). There are also two small lagoons, Tres Palos and Coyuca, along with a number of thermal springs.

Its current municipal president is Abelina López Rodríguez, from the Morena political party.

Localities 
The municipality has 231 communities and the most populous localities are:

Government 
For the names and terms of some Acapulco mayors, you can check a List of municipal presidents of Acapulco.

See also
 List of mayors of Acapulco (municipality)

References

Municipalities of Guerrero